Fluproquazone (trade name Tormosyl, RF 46-790 ) was a quinazolinone derivative with potent analgesic, antipyretic, and anti-inflammatory effects discovered by Sandoz. It was withdrawn during development due to liver toxicity.

References 

Nonsteroidal anti-inflammatory drugs
Analgesics
Quinazolines
Lactams
Fluoroarenes
Abandoned drugs
Isopropyl compounds